The Rotherham by-election was held on 28 March 1963 after the death of the Labour MP John Henry Jones in a road accident.  It was won by the Labour candidate Brian O'Malley.

493 people serving in the Armed Forces applied for nomination papers, as it was usual practice at the time that any serving personnel doing so would be given an honourable discharge.  However, unlike by-elections late the previous year, none of the candidates paid a deposit and so they secured their release without appearing on the ballot paper.

Result

References

By-elections to the Parliament of the United Kingdom in South Yorkshire constituencies
Elections in Rotherham
1963 elections in the United Kingdom
1963 in England
1960s in Yorkshire